"Movin' On" is a song written and recorded by American country music singer Merle Haggard and The Strangers.  It was released in May 1975 as the third single and partial title track from the album Keep Movin' On.  Originally, it was the theme song to the 1974-1976 NBC-TV series of the same name and references the lead characters of the series, Sonny Pruitt and Will Chandler, by name. A full-length version of the song was released as a single in 1975, and it topped the Billboard Hot Country Singles chart that July.

In addition to serving as the main theme to Movin' On, the song was among many in country music to pay homage to the American over-the-road truck driver. It should not be confused with the country standard "I'm Moving On" by Hank Snow.

Charts

Weekly charts

Year-end charts

Personnel
Merle Haggard– vocals, guitar

The Strangers:
Roy Nichols – lead guitar
Norman Hamlet – steel guitar, dobro
 Tiny Moore – mandolin
 Ronnie Reno – guitar
 Mark Yeary – piano
 Johnny Meeks - bass
Biff Adam – drums
Don Markham – saxophone

Sources
Roland, Tom, The Billboard Book of Number One Country Hits (Billboard Books, Watson-Guptill Publications, New York, 1991

References

1975 singles
1975 songs
Merle Haggard songs
Songs written by Merle Haggard
Capitol Records singles
Television drama theme songs
Songs about truck driving